Shirley Stoler (March 30, 1929 – February 17, 1999) was an American actress best known for her roles in The Honeymoon Killers and Lina Wertmüller's Seven Beauties.

Early years
The eldest of four children born to Russian Jewish immigrant parents in Brooklyn who owned a used furniture store, Stoler made her stage debut in 1955 and gained experience as a member of New York's experimental La Mama and Living Theatre companies. She had become a key underground player by the time she earned film fame in 1970 at age 41.

Film and TV career
Throughout her career, Stoler, a large and powerfully built woman who rarely smiled onscreen, often played scary villains in such films as Seven Beauties and The Honeymoon Killers and on television in an episode of Charlie's Angels. A character actress, as well as an occasional lead, Stoler appeared in small roles in Klute, The Deer Hunter, and Desperately Seeking Susan.

A highlight of her film career was her performance as the unnamed Nazi female prison commandant in Lina Wertmüller's Seven Beauties (1975), in which she played a cat-and-mouse game of seduction with the concentration camp inmate played by Giancarlo Giannini. A profile of Stoler was featured on the front page of the New York Times Arts section.

The film was nominated for an Academy Award for Best Foreign Language Film of 1976, and Wertmüller received nominations for Best Director (a first for a woman) and Best Original Screenplay; Stoler's co-star Giannini was nominated for Best Actor.

Stoler also appeared on Broadway; in the daytime soap operas The Edge of Night as Frankie and One Life to Live as Roberta (nicknamed "Tiny"); and on Saturday morning television as Mrs. Steve on Pee-wee's Playhouse.

Tim Lucas speculated she is actually Shirley Kilpatrick, changing her name after the filming of The Astounding She-Monster.

Death
Stoler lived in Manhattan, where she died at St. Vincent's Hospital and Medical Center from heart failure after a long illness, shortly before her 70th birthday.

Filmography

References

External links

1929 births
1999 deaths
20th-century American actresses
Actresses from New York City
American film actresses
American soap opera actresses
American stage actresses
American television actresses
American people of Russian-Jewish descent
People from Brooklyn